The Center for Advanced Study in the Behavioral Sciences (CASBS) is an interdisciplinary research lab at Stanford University that offers a residential postdoctoral fellowship program for scientists and scholars studying "the five core social and behavioral disciplines of anthropology, economics, political science, psychology, and sociology".

It is one of the (currently ten) members of Some Institutes for Advanced Study (SIAS). It has 54 studies, meeting rooms, a conference hall, a kitchen, and dining room with a private chef.

Political scientist Margaret Levi is the director of the center.

History 
The center was founded in 1954 by the Ford Foundation. The American educator Ralph W. Tyler served as the center's first director from 1954 to 1966. The CASBS buildings were designed by William Wurster, a local architect.

Earlier, fellow selection was a closed process; new fellows were nominated by former fellows. However, since 2007, the center opened up the fellow selection process to applications. In 2008 it became officially part of Stanford University and reports to the Vice-Provost and Dean of Research.

Fellows 
Each class of fellows numbers about 40 people. In the first 40 years of its existence it supported about 2,000 scientists and scholars.

Notable fellows 
The institute has been home to notable scholars, including:

 Paul S. Appelbaum
 Alexander Astin
 Leora Auslander
 Ludwig von Bertalanffy
 Anthony Bebbington
 Jamshed Bharucha
 Derek Bok
 Kenneth Boulding
 Justine Cassell
 Dorothy Cheney
 Leda Cosmides
 Kimberlé Crenshaw
 Shmuel Noah Eisenstadt
 Yehuda Elkana
 Robert H. Frank
 Harold Garfinkel
 Henry Louis Gates
 Ralph W. Gerard
 Ruth Bader Ginsburg
 Mark Granovetter
 Adriaan de Groot
 Lani Guinier
 Leopold H. Haimson
 Eszter Hargittai
 John Haugeland
 Kieran Healy
 Miles Hewstone
 Douglas Hofstadter
 Philip N. Howard
 Katherine Isbister
 Murray Jarvik
 Lee Jussim
 Daniel Kahneman
 Robert Kates
 Elihu Katz
 Thomas Kuhn
 Terra Lawson-Remer
 Catharine MacKinnon
 Michael Macy
 George Mandler
 Paul Milgrom
 Elijah Millgram
 Ernest Nagel
 Rodney Needham
 Don Norman
 Robert Nozick
 Margaret O'Mara
 Anatol Rapoport
 John Rawls
 Julie Reuben
 Edward Said
 Richard Sennett
 Andrea diSessa
 Kevin Hora
Bradd Shore
 Sidney Siegel
 Neil Smelser
 Vernon L. Smith
 Richard C. Snyder
 Thomas Sowell
 Herman D. Stein
 Li Chenyang
 Deborah Tannen
 Charles Tilly
 John Tooby
 Edward Tufte
 Billie Lee Turner II
 France Winddance Twine
 Vanessa C. Tyson
 Philip E. Vernon
 Gordon S. Wood
 Irvin Yalom
 Benjamin Mako Hill

References

External links
 Center for Advanced Study website

 List of CASBS Fellows

Research institutes established in 1954
Research institutes in the San Francisco Bay Area
Non-profit organizations based in California
Social science institutes
Stanford University
Institute for Advanced Study